Neonitocris mangenoti is a species of beetle in the family Cerambycidae. It was described by Lepesme and Stephan von Breuning in 1953.

References

mangenoti
Beetles described in 1953